Moisiu is a surname. Notable people with the surname include:

 Aleksandër Moisiu (1879–1935), Austrian stage actor
 Alfred Moisiu (born 1929), Albanian diplomat and politician
 Spiro Moisiu (1900–1981), Albanian military officer

See also
Mojsije